Đurica Jojkić (1914, in Turija – 1981, in Belgrade) was a Yugoslav politician and lawyer.

Biography 
He was born in 1914 in Turija near Srbobran. He studied in gymnasiums in Srbobran and Vrbas, before finishing the University of Belgrade Faculty of Law in Belgrade. He later finished Party College "Đuro Đaković" also in Belgrade. During World War II he was active in the Vojvodina region and served as the vice president of the People's Liberation Committee for the Novi Sad district. After the war, he continued to be a member of the parliament for Serbia until his death. In 1951 he was elected as the Mayor of Belgrade and he served that role until 1954 and later again between 1957 and 1961.

References

1914 births
1981 deaths
Serbian politicians
Prime Ministers of Serbia
20th-century Serbian people
Yugoslav lawyers
University of Belgrade Faculty of Law alumni
People from South Bačka District